XEMT-AM was a Spanish-language AM radio station that served the Brownsville, Texas (United States) / Matamoros, Tamaulipas (Mexico) border area. The last brand that the station carried was Radio Diamante with a Spanish pop format.

History

XEMT received its concession on June 17, 1950. It was owned by Severo Garza Saenz and broadcast with 250 watts. XEMT was bought by Radio Impulsora, S.A., in 1973, and by Radio Emisora del Noreste, S.A., in 1985. By this time, XEMT broadcast with 1,000 watts. It was sold in 2004 to the current concessionaire and cut its power to 600 watts.

On March 10, 2021, the Federal Telecommunications Institute denied an application for the renewal of XEMT-AM's concession. The station had failed to pay five of the ten installments of its last renewal, in addition to failure to file other obligatory reports or comply with needed changes to company bylaws.

External links
 
 
 raiostationworld.com; Radio stations in the Rio Grande Valley

References

Spanish-language radio stations
Radio stations in Matamoros, Tamaulipas
Radio stations established in 1950
Radio stations disestablished in 2021
Defunct radio stations in Mexico